Salado Creek, originally Arroyo Salado Grande (Big Salt Creek) is a tributary of the San Joaquin River draining eastern slopes of part of the Diablo Range within the Central Valley of California, United States.   The Creek ends before it reaches the San Joaquin River, north of Patterson in Stanislaus County.

History
Arroyo de La Puerta was a watering place on El Camino Viejoin the San Joaquin Valley and provided water for Rancho Del Puerto.

References

See also
 Salado Creek AVA
 Latta Creek

Rivers of Stanislaus County, California
Tributaries of the San Joaquin River
Diablo Range
El Camino Viejo
Rivers of Northern California